At a height of , the Seebuck  is the second highest mountain of the Black Forest after the Feldberg. It is located in the German state of Baden-Württemberg.

Geography 

The mountain rises in the Southern Black Forest immediately southeast of the Feldberg, of which it is sometimes considered a part because both mountains are part of the same ridge, only separated by a shallow depression called the Grüble or Feldberg Saddle (Feldbergsattel).

The Seebuck drops steeply eastwards into the Feldsee lake, through which the Seebach flows, a stream that is later called the Gutach and then the Wutach. The Felsenweg ("Rock Path") which runs from the summit area down the steep mountainside to the Feldsee is only suitable for hikers with robust footwear and sure-footedness, but is very attractive thanks to its varied route and views of the Feldsee below.

Tourism

Feldberg Tower 
The Feldberg Tower (Feldbergturm) is located on the Seebuck. This is a former transmission tower that now acts as an observation tower and, since 2013, has housed a ham museum.

Summer 
The mountain is a popular destination for day trippers. The car park at the foot of the Seebuck is the base for numerous walks to the nearby ridge (to the Feldberg, Stübenwasen and Notschrei, to the Toter Mann, to the Herzogenhorn or to Hinterzarten), as well as walks to the nearby valleys (Menzenschwand valley, Wiese, St. Wilhelm's Valley, Zastler valley).

Culture 

In the summit area of the Seebuck on the edge of the Feldsee bowl is a Bismarck monument made of rubble stone, and on which is a portrait medallion, that was built between 1895 and 1896 by Fridolin Dietsche. The relief was cast by Wilhelm Pelargus in Stuttgart, the first sketch was made by Karlsruhe professor, Karl Gagel (1861–1916). For its unveiling on 4 October 1896 the committee for the erection of the monument sent Otto von Bismarck a telegramme. His answer was printed in the Freiburger Zeitung:

The occasion itself celebrated with a banquet on the evening before and an official lunch on the day of the opening ceremony. To handle the numbers of festival guests, a special train ran from Freiburg nach Titisee on the Höllental Railway.

In September 2009 the monument was renovated, the first time for eleven years.

On the edge of the large car park at the foot of the Seebuck (near the Feldberger Hof) a nature conservation centre for the Southern Black Forest was built, the "House of Nature" (Haus der Natur). A little below it, above the federal road is the highest church in Germany: the Catholic parish church of the Transfiguration of Christ.

References

External links 

 Feldberg Tower and Ham Museum

One-thousanders of Germany
Mountains and hills of Baden-Württemberg
Mountains and hills of the Black Forest
Ski areas and resorts in Germany